Pirəbədil (also, Pirebedil’) is a village and municipality in the Davachi Rayon of Azerbaijan.  It has a population of 834.  The municipality consists of the villages of Pirəbədil, Sumağava, Sumağavaqazma, and Zöhramlı.

Notable natives 
 Ayna Sultanova — one of the first Azeri women revolutionaries, People's Commissar of Justice of the Azerbaijan SSR; its name is associated with appearance of the first in the East women's magazine "Shark Kadyny" ("Woman of the East"); sister of Gazanfar Musabekov and the wife of Hamid Sultanov.
 Gazanfar Musabekov — Chairman of the Council of People's Commissars of the Azerbaijan SSR (1922–1930), Chairman of the Council of People's Commissars ZSFSR (1932–1936), Chairman of the Central Executive Committee of Azerbaijan SSR.

References 

Populated places in Shabran District